Maybole Junction railway station was a railway station located between Alloway and Dalrymple in South Ayrshire, Scotland. The station was originally part of the Ayr and Dalmellington Railway (worked and later owned by the Glasgow and South Western Railway).

History 

The station opened on 13 October 1856, and closed 1 December 1859. Remained open for goods traffic only for many years afterwards when it was renamed Dalrymple Junction.

References

Notes

Sources 
 
 

Disused railway stations in South Ayrshire
Railway stations in Great Britain opened in 1856
Railway stations in Great Britain closed in 1859
Former Glasgow and South Western Railway stations